Telecom of Kosovo , trading as Vala, is a business unit of Post and Telecom of Kosovo. Telecom of Kosovo is a licensed public operator and the first choice provider of fixed network services and internet in the territory of Kosovo. At the end of 2010 Telecom of Kosovo began to provide triple-play services for its customers. With the new IPTV platform, Telecom of Kosovo together with Tring Digital started the Cable TV & IPTV service branded TiK TV. Voice, Internet and media services in combination are provided with lower rates for about 30%.
The Director of Telecom of Kosovo is Mr. Mehdi Latifaj, under its management and its team Telecom of Kosovo has achieved very large number of projects which led the company to the top of success.

See also 
 Posta e Kosovës
 Post and Telecommunication of Kosovo
Telephone numbers in Kosovo

References

Kosovo Telecom

Telecommunications in Kosovo